The  is a third-sector railway line in the city of Nagoya operated by the .

This line is still operated as a freight line by Japan Freight Railway Company (JR Freight) between Nagoya and Nagoya Freight Terminal, and so the section between Nagoya and Arako Station is used for both passenger and freight traffic.

Stations 
There are two services on the line: Local and Non-stop.
Non-stop services only stop at Nagoya and Kinjō-futō.

Rolling stock
Services on the line are operated by a fleet of eight four-car 1000 series electric multiple unit (EMU) trains.

History

Nagoya Freight Terminal opened on 1 October 1980, and with the closure of Sasashima Freight Terminal on 1 November 1986, Nagoya Freight Terminal became the starting point of the line. With the privatization and division of JNR on 1 April 1987, the line was transferred to Central Japan Railway Company (JR Central) as a "Class 1 railway operator" and JR Freight as a "Class 2 railway operator".

Plans to operate passenger services on the line were formalized in the 1990s, and Nagoya Rinkai Rapid Transit company was established in 1997 as a third-sector company funded by the city of Nagoya. The passenger Aonami Line utilized approximately 12 km of existing freight line with a new approximately 4 km extension to Kinjō-futō Station. Construction started in 2000, with improvement to the line and new stations added between Nagoya and Nakajima stations.  The tracks between Nakajima and Kinjō-futō stations were raised to remove level crossings and alleviate road congestion. Construction cost around 93 billion yen. The line opened on 6 October 2004, and at the same time, the section of track between Nagoya Station and Nagoya Freight Terminal was closed.

Despite serving attractions such as the Nagoya International Exhibition Hall and Nagoya Race Course, passenger ridership figures fell short of targets, and in July 2010, the operating company declared debts of approximately 46 billion yen, applying for alternative dispute resolution (ADR) to avoid bankruptcy.

A special "SL Aonami-go" steam train service operated on the Aonami Line on 16 and 17 February 2013, using JNR Class C56 locomotive number 160 as well as three 12 series passenger coaches.

On 27 March 2017, a special Legoland-themed train started operating on the line to commemorate the opening of Legoland Japan. The park is located by Kinjō-futō station.

See also
 List of railway lines in Japan

References

External links

  

Railway lines in Japan
Rail transport in Nagoya
Railway lines opened in 2004
1067 mm gauge railways in Japan
Japanese third-sector railway lines